William Shieh (#333) is an electrical engineer at the University of Melbourne in Glen Waverley, Victoria, Australia. He was named a Fellow of the Institute of Electrical and Electronics Engineers in 2013 for his contributions to coherent optical orthogonal frequency-division multiplexing. He was also made a Fellow of the Optical Society.

References 

Fellow Members of the IEEE
Living people
Australian electrical engineers
Academic staff of the University of Melbourne
Fellows of Optica (society)
Year of birth missing (living people)